Joey Franklin Bragg (born July 20, 1996) is an American actor and comedian.

Career
Bragg is known for his role as Freddie Raines in Call Your Mother and previous role as Joey Rooney in the Disney Channel sitcom Liv and Maddie, which aired from 2013 to 2017. He also played Magoo in the 2012 television film Fred 3: Camp Fred, and co-headlined the 2015 Disney XD television film Mark & Russell's Wild Ride.
Bragg has a successful stand-up comedy career. He is Jewish.

Filmography

References

External links
 
 

1996 births
Living people
21st-century American comedians
21st-century American male actors
20th-century American Jews
American male comedians
American male film actors
American male television actors
American stand-up comedians
Comedians from California
Male actors from California
People from Union City, California
21st-century American Jews